Mervyn Eustace Morris OM (born 21 February 1937) is a poet and professor emeritus at the University of the West Indies, Mona, Jamaica. According to educator Ralph Thompson, "In addition to his poetry, which has ranked him among the top West Indian poets, he was one of the first academics to espouse the importance of nation language in helping to define in verse important aspects of Jamaican culture."

Biography 
Mervyn Morris was born in Kingston, Jamaica, and studied at the University College of the West Indies (UWI) and as a Rhodes Scholar at St Edmund Hall, Oxford. In 1970, he began lecturing at UWI, where he went on to be appointed a Reader in West Indian Literature. In 1992 he was a UK Arts Council Visiting Writer-in-Residence at the South Bank Centre. He lives in Kingston, Jamaica, where he is Professor Emeritus of Creative Writing & West Indian Literature.

In 2009, Morris was awarded the Jamaican Order of Merit. 
In 2014, Morris was appointed the Poet Laureate of Jamaica, the first to be accorded the title since the country's independence (the previous holders being Tom Redcam, who was appointed posthumously in 1933, and John Ebenezer Clare McFarlane, appointed in 1953). The investiture ceremony took place at King's House on 22 May.

In March 2021, Morris was announced as the co-recipient, together with Edward Baugh, of the 2021 Bocas Henry Swanzy Award.

Works 
Morris has published several volumes of poetry, and has edited the works of other Caribbean writers. His collections include The Pond (revised edition, New Beacon Books, 1997), Shadowboxing (New Beacon Books, 1979), Examination Centre (New Beacon Books, 1992) and On Holy Week (a sequence of poems for radio, Dangaroo Press, 1993). He also edited The Faber Book of Contemporary Caribbean Short Stories and published "Is English We Speaking", and other essays. In 2006, Carcanet Press published his I been there, sort of: New and Selected Poems.

The best known poems by Morris include: "Little Boy Crying", "Family Pictures", "Love Is", "One, Two", "Home", "The Roaches", "The Pond" and "Critic".

Selected bibliography

Poetry

 The Pond – New Beacon Books, 1973.  (hb
 On Holy Week – Dangaroo Press, 1976.  (pb)
 Shadow Boxing – New Beacon Books, 1979.  (pb)
 Examination Centre – New Beacon Books, 1992.  (pb)
 I Been There, Sort Of: New and Selected Poems – Carcanet Press, 2006.  (pb)

Non-fiction

 "Is English We Speaking", and other essays – Ian Randle Publishers, 1999.  (pb)
 Making West Indian Literature – Ian Randle Publishers, 2005.  (pb)
 Miss Lou: Louise Bennett and Jamaican Culture – Signal Books, 2014.  (pb)

As editor

 Seven Jamaican Poets - 1971
 The Faber Book of Contemporary Caribbean Short Stories – Faber & Faber, 1990.  (pb)
 (with Jimmy Carnegie) Lunch Time Medley: Writings on West Indies Cricket – Ian Randle Publishers, 2008.  (pb)
 (with Carolyn Allen) Writing Life: Reflections by West Indian Writers – Ian Randle Publishers, 2008.  (pb)

References

Further reading
Glyne Griffith, Review of I Been There, Sort of: New and Selected Poems, in The Caribbean Review of Books (reprinted at Carcanet).

External links
 "Mervyn Morris", The Poetry Archive.
 Mervyn Morris, "Poet Laureate Remarks at Investiture Ceremony, King's House, 21 May 2014".
 Geoffrey Philp, "An Interview With Mervyn Morris", 7 December 2007.

20th-century Jamaican poets
21st-century Jamaican poets
Jamaican Poets Laureate
Jamaican male poets
20th-century male writers
21st-century male writers
University of the West Indies academics
Recipients of the Order of Merit (Jamaica)
People from Kingston, Jamaica
1937 births
Living people